Anthony John Dexter (born Walter Reinhold Alfred Fleischmann, January 19, 1913 – March 27, 2001) was an American actor known for his striking resemblance to silent film hero Rudolph Valentino, whom he portrayed in the 1951 biographic Valentino. Dexter sometimes used the pseudonym Walter Craig. He was known for portraying many real-life characters such as Captain John Smith, Captain William Kidd, Billy the Kid and Christopher Columbus.

Biography
Born Walter Reinhold Alfred Fleischmann in Nebraska, he earned an  athletic scholarship to St. Olaf College in Northfield, Minnesota and later earned a Master of Arts from the University of Iowa. During World War II he served in the U.S. Army's Special Services in England earning the rank of Sergeant. After the war he performed on Broadway productions of The Three Sisters, Ah, Wilderness and The Barretts of Wimpole Street.

When preparing a film biography of Rudolph Valentino, Valentino, producer Edward Small chose Dexter for the lead from over 75,000 applicants and 400 screen tests. His incredible likeness to Valentino led to a contract with Columbia Pictures, but hampered him in achieving substantial film roles. When Dexter broke his contract with Edward Small due to the producer wanting to use him exclusively in Valentino-type roles, Dexter soon found that other producers wished him to do the same - for less money. He also made three unsuccessful television pilots, two of them swashbucklers.

In 1960, guest starred on Gene Barry's TV Western Bat Masterson, playing a large and rare role as the episode long sidekick to Bat Masterson, Allesandro Valin in S2E35's "The Big Gamble".

After his movie career ended, Dexter, now known as Walter Craig, taught high school English, speech, and drama classes at Eagle Rock High School (circa 1968–1978) in the Los Angeles area. When he retired from teaching, Craig moved to Greeley, Colorado, where he lived until his death on March 27, 2001. He had two daughters, Kimberly and Claudia.

Filmography

References

External links

 Homepage
Marsha Hunt on Anthony Dexter

1913 births
2001 deaths
20th-century American male actors
American male film actors
United States Army personnel of World War II
Male actors from Nebraska
St. Olaf College alumni
University of Iowa alumni
United States Army soldiers